Federico Viviani (born 19 October 1981) is an Italian footballer. Viviani made 280 league appearances in Italian Serie B, Serie C1 and Serie C2, as well as 70 appearances in Serie D, the top division of non fully professional football. However, Viviani never made his debut in Serie A, the Italian top division.

Biography

Youth career
Born in Pisa, Tuscany, Viviani started his career at Pisa. He made his Serie C2 debut on 10 January 1999, replacing Paolo Andreotti at half-time.

In 2001–02 he left for Serie D club Cascina.

Lega Pro clubs
In 2003–04 he returned to fully professional for Sansovino. In January 2006 he was spotted by Serie B team Arezzo, which signed him in co-ownership deal and bought the remain 50% registration rights in June. However, he left for Serie C1 club Juve Stabia. In January 2007 he returned to Sansovino and winning the relegation "play-out" against Boca San Lazzaro, secured a place in 2007–08 Serie C2.

As Arezzo relegated to Serie C1 in 2007, he was sold to fellow third division club Lanciano in August.

Pisa & Crotone
In January 2008 he was re-signed by Serie B team Pisa. He only made 5 starts in 2007–08 Serie B and played 37 games in the next season. Pisa relegated in 2009 and bankrupted.

He then signed by Lega Pro Prima Divisione (ex–Serie C1) club Taranto. In January 2010 he returned to Serie B for the third time, for F.C. Crotone.

Return to Lega Pro
On 20 August 2011 he was signed by Alessandria. On 31 January 2014 Viviani was released.

Career statistics

Note
1 4 games in 2005–06 Serie C2 promotion play-off
2 The player arrived the club after the club was eliminated from the competitions 
3 2 games in 2006–07 Serie C2 relegation "play-out"
4 No statistics for Coppa Italia Serie D and Coppa Italia Lega Pro (prior 2007)
5 Note 1 to 4

Honours
Serie C2: 1999

References

External links
 Football.it Profile 
 Lega Serie B Profile 
 

Italian footballers
Serie B players
Serie C players
Pisa S.C. players
A.C. Sansovino players
S.S. Arezzo players
S.S. Juve Stabia players
S.S. Virtus Lanciano 1924 players
Taranto F.C. 1927 players
F.C. Crotone players
U.S. Alessandria Calcio 1912 players
Association football central defenders
Sportspeople from Pisa
1981 births
Living people
Footballers from Tuscany